Sphenophorus compressirostris is a species of beetle in the family Curculionidae found in North America. The name should not be confused with Sphenophorus compessirostris (Say, 1824), a name replaced with Sphenophorus cultrirostris Gyllenhal, 1838.

References

Dryophthorinae
Articles created by Qbugbot
Beetles described in 1823